RTB Perdana (formerly known as RTB1 and Television Service, stylised as RTB perdana) is the oldest free-to-air terrestrial television channel in Brunei. The channel officially began broadcasting on 1 March 1975 and colour television on 9 July 1975.

RTB Perdana broadcasts for 17-hours from 06:00 until 23:00 BST followed by a satellite simulcast of RTB Sukmaindera filling the rest of its broadcasting time. It mainly shows documentaries, educational programs and news during its broadcasting time.

On 11 April 2017, TV1 along with sister station TV3 HD officially merged and renamed RTB Perdana as part of RTB's rebranding project as well as broadcaster's shift from analogue into digital broadcasting.

References

External links
 About RTB Perdana at RTB official website

1975 establishments in Brunei
Television channels in Brunei
Malay language television stations
Television channels and stations established in 1975